Ematops randalli is a species of viviparous brotula found in the Pacific Ocean around Samoa and Vanuatu where it inhabits reef environments.  This species grows to a length of  SL. The specific name honours the American ichthyologist John E. Randall of the Bishop Museum who assisted in the collection of the type.

References

Bythitidae
Monotypic fish genera
Taxa named by Daniel Morris Cohen 
Taxa named by John Peter Barton Wourms
Fish described in 1976